Guy Sylvestre (Jean-Guy Sylvestre), OC, FRSC (May 17, 1918 – September 26, 2010) was a Canadian literary critic, librarian and civil servant.

Born in Sorel, Quebec, he attended College Ste-Marie, Montreal, and received his B.A. in 1939 and MA in 1942 from the University of Ottawa where he began his literary career as writer and critic.

By his early twenties, he was already the author of several articles in journals and newspapers, literary critic for the Ottawa newspaper Le Droit 1939–48, and founder of his own journal. Publication of Anthologie de la poésie canadienne d’expression française established him as an intellectual and a specialist in Canadian poetry. He was a founding member of the Académie canadienne-française in 1944  and President of the Royal Society of Canada 1973–74.

Sylvestre served as a translator in the Senate of Canada 1942–1944 and at the World War II Wartime Information Board in 1944–45. He was subsequently private secretary to the Rt. Hon. Louis St. Laurent, Prime Minister of Canada, between 1945 and 1950, a position which led to important civil service jobs.

In 1956 to 1968, he was Associate Director of the Library of Parliament and then became the second National Librarian at what is now Library and Archives Canada from 1968 to 1983. The library experienced extraordinary growth under his leadership, housed in a new building on Wellington Street. The collection grew rapidly and the national bibliography Canadiana was automated.

After retirement from the civil service, he was President of the Canadian Institute for Historical Microreproductions from 1983 to 1986; Chairman, Ottawa Valley Book Festival, 1988–92; Chairman of Committee for the Governor General's Literary Awards; Past Chairman, Canadian Writers Foundation.

President, World Poetry Conference, 1967. Ordre International du bien public, 1970; Order of Merit of the Republic of Poland ; IFLA Medal; Canadian Representative Intergovernmental Council for General Information Programs, Unesco 1979–83; Canadian Delegation to UNESCO, Conferences 1949, 1970, 1972, 1974; Chairman, Conference of Directors of National Libraries, 1974–77; Chairman, National Libraries Section, IFLA, 1977–81; Canadian Public Service Outstanding Public Service Award, 1983; Societa' Dante Alighieri, rome, 1971; Life member, Canadian Library Association,(CLA); Association Technologie de la documentation; Honorary Life member, Ontario Library Association(OLA); Member and First President, Canadian Association for Information Science; Recipient of Queen Elizabeth II Golden Jubilee Medal.

In 1943, he married Françoise Poitevin. They had a daughter (Marie) and three sons (Jean, Louis and Paul). They have two grandchildren Jean Martin and Julie Michelle.

Bibliography 

Louis Francoeur, journaliste, 1941
Situation de la poésie canadienne, 1942
Anthologie de la poésie canadienne d'expression française, 1943
Poètes catholiques de la France contemporaine, 1944
Jules Laforgue, 1945
Sondages, 1945
Impressions de théâtre, 1950
Panorama des lettres canadiennes françaises, 1964
Canadian writers / Écrivains canadiens, 1964
Un siècle de littérature canadienne, 1967
Guidelines for national libraries, 1987.
Full publications list at WorldCat

References

External links
 Collections Canada: A Speech by Dr. Guy Sylvestre
 Collections Canada: Guy Sylvestre
 The Royal Society of Canada: Past Presidents
 IFLA Anniversary
 Canadiana: CIHM Anniversary
 IFLA Guidelines for National Libraries
 CBC News Archive: The National Library of Canada opens new HQ
 PSC: Outstanding Performance Awards
 Guy Sylvestre biography at Ex Libris Association
 Archives of Guy Sylvestre (Fonds Guy Sylvestre, R11816) are held at Library and Archives Canada. Records are in French and English.

1918 births
2010 deaths
20th-century Canadian civil servants
Canadian literary critics
Canadian librarians
Canadian non-fiction writers in French
Fellows of the Royal Society of Canada
Franco-Ontarian people
Officers of the Order of Canada
People from Sorel-Tracy
University of Ottawa alumni